Glenn Jarrett (born August 11, 1950) is an American former NASCAR driver from Conover, North Carolina and the oldest son of Ned Jarrett and older brother of Dale Jarrett. He made 10 Winston Cup starts from 1978 to 1983 with a best finish of 12th at Ontario Motor Speedway. He then drove in the Busch Series where he made 67 starts from 1982 to 1993 with a best finish of 4th and finished 13th in 1984 series points. He was then a pit reporter for TNN's coverage of NASCAR. After TNN's coverage ceased he became a pit reporter for Speed Channel and was used when Speed Channel needed to cover multiple NASCAR races at different facilities on the same day.

In 1982, Jarrett was a technical advisor to the Kenny Rogers movie Six Pack.

Jarrett is currently a pit reporter for MRN radio coverage.

Motorsports career results

NASCAR
(key) (Bold – Pole position awarded by qualifying time. Italics – Pole position earned by points standings or practice time. * – Most laps led.)

Winston Cup Series

Daytona 500

Busch Series

References

External links
 

Living people
1950 births
People from Conover, North Carolina
Racing drivers from North Carolina
NASCAR drivers
Motorsport announcers
Jarrett family
American radio sports announcers
American television sports announcers